The fight-or-flight response (also called hyperarousal or the acute stress response) is a physiological reaction that occurs in response to a perceived harmful event, attack, or threat to survival. It was first described by Walter Bradford Cannon. His theory states that animals react to threats with a general discharge of the sympathetic nervous system, preparing the animal for fighting or fleeing. More specifically, the adrenal medulla produces a hormonal cascade that results in the secretion of catecholamines, especially norepinephrine and epinephrine. The hormones estrogen, testosterone, and cortisol, as well as the neurotransmitters dopamine and serotonin, also affect how organisms react to stress. The hormone osteocalcin might also play a part.

This response is recognised as the first stage of the general adaptation syndrome that regulates stress responses among vertebrates and other organisms.

Name
Originally understood as the fight-or-flight response in Cannon's research, the state of hyperarousal results in several responses beyond fighting or fleeing. This has led people to calling it the fight, flight, freeze response (or fight-flight-faint-or-freeze, among other variants). The wider array of responses, such as freezing, fainting, fleeing, or experiencing fright, has led researchers to use more neutral or accommodating terminology such as hyperarousal or the acute stress response.

Physiology

Autonomic nervous system

The autonomic nervous system is a control system that acts largely unconsciously and regulates heart rate, digestion, respiratory rate, pupillary response, urination, and sexual arousal. This system is the primary mechanism in control of the fight-or-flight response and its role is mediated by two different components: the sympathetic nervous system and the parasympathetic nervous system.

Sympathetic nervous system

The sympathetic nervous system originates in the spinal cord and its main function is to activate the physiological changes that occur during the fight-or-flight response. This component of the autonomic nervous system utilises and activates the release of norepinephrine in the reaction.

Parasympathetic nervous system

The parasympathetic nervous system originates in the sacral spinal cord and medulla, physically surrounding the sympathetic origin, and works in concert with the sympathetic nervous system. Its main function is to activate the "rest and digest" response and return the body to homeostasis after the fight or flight response. This system utilises and activates the release of the neurotransmitter acetylcholine.

Reaction

The reaction begins in the amygdala, which triggers a neural response in the hypothalamus. The initial reaction is followed by activation of the pituitary gland and secretion of the hormone ACTH. The adrenal gland is activated almost simultaneously, via the sympathetic nervous system, and releases the hormone epinephrine. The release of chemical messengers results in the production of the hormone cortisol, which increases blood pressure, blood sugar, and suppresses the immune system. The initial response and subsequent reactions are triggered in an effort to create a boost of energy. This boost of energy is activated by epinephrine binding to liver cells and the subsequent production of glucose. Additionally, the circulation of cortisol functions to turn fatty acids into available energy, which prepares muscles throughout the body for response. Catecholamine hormones, such as adrenaline (epinephrine) or noradrenaline (norepinephrine), facilitate immediate physical reactions associated with a preparation for violent muscular action and:
 Acceleration of heart and lung action
 Paling or flushing, or alternating between both
 Inhibition of stomach and upper-intestinal action to the point where digestion slows down or stops
 General effect on the sphincters of the body
 Constriction of blood vessels in many parts of the body
 Liberation of metabolic energy sources (particularly fat and glycogen) for muscular action
 Dilation of blood vessels for muscles
 Inhibition of the lacrimal gland (responsible for tear production) and salivation
 Dilation of pupil (mydriasis)
 Relaxation of bladder
 Inhibition of erection
 Auditory exclusion (loss of hearing)
 Tunnel vision (loss of peripheral vision)
 Disinhibition of spinal reflexes
 Shaking

Function of physiological changes
The physiological changes that occur during the fight or flight response are activated in order to give the body increased strength and speed in anticipation of fighting or running. Some of the specific physiological changes and their functions include:
 Increased blood flow to the muscles activated by diverting blood flow from other parts of the body.
 Increased blood pressure, heart rate, blood sugars, and fats in order to supply the body with extra energy.
 The blood clotting function of the body speeds up in order to prevent excessive blood loss in the event of an injury sustained during the response.
 Increased muscle tension in order to provide the body with extra speed and strength.

Emotional components

Emotion regulation

In the context of the fight or flight response, emotional regulation is used proactively to avoid threats of stress or to control the level of emotional arousal.

Emotional reactivity
During the reaction, the intensity of emotion that is brought on by the stimulus will also determine the nature and intensity of the behavioral response. Individuals with higher levels of emotional reactivity may be prone to anxiety and aggression, which illustrates the implications of appropriate emotional reaction in the fight or flight response.

Cognitive components

Content specificity
The specific components of cognitions in the fight or flight response seem to be largely negative. These negative cognitions may be characterised by: attention to negative stimuli, the perception of ambiguous situations as negative, and the recurrence of recalling negative words. There also may be specific negative thoughts associated with emotions commonly seen in the reaction.

Perception of control

Perceived control relates to an individual's thoughts about control over situations and events. Perceived control should be differentiated from actual control because an individual's beliefs about their abilities may not reflect their actual abilities. Therefore, overestimation or underestimation of perceived control can lead to anxiety and aggression.

Social information processing

The social information processing model proposes a variety of factors that determine behavior in the context of social situations and preexisting thoughts. The attribution of hostility, especially in ambiguous situations, seems to be one of the most important cognitive factors associated with the fight or flight response because of its implications towards aggression.

Other animals

Evolutionary perspective
An evolutionary psychology explanation is that early animals had to react to threatening stimuli quickly and did not have time to psychologically and physically prepare themselves. The fight or flight response provided them with the mechanisms to rapidly respond to threats against survival.

Examples
A typical example of the stress response is a grazing zebra. If the zebra sees a lion closing in for the kill, the stress response is activated as a means to escape its predator. The escape requires intense muscular effort, supported by all of the body's systems. The sympathetic nervous system’s activation  provides for these needs. A similar example involving fight is of a cat about to be attacked by a dog. The cat shows accelerated heartbeat, piloerection (hair standing on end), and pupil dilation, all signs of sympathetic arousal. Note that the zebra and cat still maintain homeostasis in all states.

In July 1992, Behavioral Ecology published experimental research conducted by biologist Lee A. Dugatkin where guppies were sorted into "bold", "ordinary", and "timid" groups based upon their reactions when confronted by a smallmouth bass (i.e. inspecting the predator, hiding, or swimming away) after which the guppies were left in a tank with the bass. After 60 hours, 40 percent of the timid guppies and 15 percent of the ordinary guppies survived while none of the bold guppies did.

Varieties of responses

Animals respond to threats in many complex ways. Rats, for instance, try to escape when threatened but will fight when cornered. Some animals stand perfectly still so that predators will not see them. Many animals freeze or play dead when touched in the hope that the predator will lose interest.

Other animals have alternative self-protection methods. Some species of cold-blooded animals change color swiftly to camouflage themselves. These responses are triggered by the sympathetic nervous system, but, in order to fit the model of fight or flight, the idea of flight must be broadened to include escaping capture either in a physical or sensory way. Thus, flight can be disappearing to another location or just disappearing in place, and fight and flight are often combined in a given situation.

The fight or flight actions also have polarity – the individual can either fight against or flee from something that is threatening, such as a hungry lion, or fight for or fly towards something that is needed, such as the safety of the shore from a raging river.

A threat from another animal does not always result in immediate fight or flight. There may be a period of heightened awareness, during which each animal interprets behavioral signals from the other. Signs such as paling, piloerection, immobility, sounds, and body language communicate the status and intentions of each animal. There may be a sort of negotiation, after which fight or flight may ensue, but which might also result in playing, mating, or nothing at all. An example of this is kittens playing: each kitten shows the signs of sympathetic arousal, but they never inflict real damage.

See also

Notes

References

Further reading
 Sapolsky, Robert M., 1994.  Why Zebras Don't Get Ulcers.  W.H. Freeman and Company.

External links

Sympathetic nervous system
Aggression
Fear
Dichotomies
Psychological theories
Evolutionary psychology